A constitutional referendum was held in the Central African Republic on 28 December 1994. The new constitution would make the country a presidential republic with a unicameral National Assembly and a Prime Minister accountable to both the President and the National Assembly. It was approved by 82.7% of voters with a 45% turnout.

Results

References

1994 referendums
1994 in the Central African Republic
1994
Constitutional referendums